The 2013 NAB Cup was an Australian Football League (AFL) pre-season competition that was played before the 2013 home and away season. The tournament commenced on 15 February 2013, and concluded with the NAB Cup Grand Final on 15 March 2013.

The competition format was the same as the previous year and once again featured eighteen teams. Matches were played at both regular AFL venues and select regional centres. All matches in the first three rounds of the competition counted equally with four points for a win and percentage also being taken into account. Teams not playing in the first week of Round 1 of the 2013 AFL season played one last pre-season match at various metropolitan locations across Australia in week 5.

The format for the 2013 NAB Cup was as follows:
Weeks 1 and 2: The eighteen teams were split into six pools of three teams each. The three teams in each pool played each other in games of two 20-minute halves, with all three games being played over a three-hour period at the one venue.
Weeks 3 and 4: The eighteen teams played full length matches each week in either metropolitan or regional areas.
Week 5: The two best ranked teams played in the NAB Cup Grand Final. Teams not playing in the first week of Round 1 of the 2013 AFL season played a full length match in either metropolitan or regional areas.

Games
The fixtures were announced by the AFL on 24 October 2012. All times listed are local times.

Round 1

Round 2

Round 3

Grand Final

NAB Challenge

Ladder

See also
2013 AFL season

References

NAB Cup
Australian Football League pre-season competition